Verna Dolores Hillie (May 5, 1914 – October 3, 1997) was an American film actress. First recruited into movie acting by a contest, she went on to star in films for Paramount Pictures and other studios through the 1930s, before retiring from acting in the early 1940s.

Acting career

Hillie began acting as a teenager in Detroit, Michigan, where she got a part in a radio drama on station WWJ. Against her wishes, her mother submitted her photo to a national competition for the role of "Lota the Panther Woman" in Paramount's 1932 film Island of Lost Souls. When Paramount contacted her for a tryout, she reluctantly agreed, but eventually came to enjoy the process. She lost the competition to Kathleen Burke, but the studio gave her a contract anyway, starting her with a bit part in Madame Butterfly.

She became better known after her supporting role in Under the Tonto Rim in 1933. When Hillie contracted Bell's palsy, Paramount dropped her contract, but she soon recovered and began working for other studios. In 1934 she co-starred with Ken Maynard in Mystery Mountain, a Western serial film from Mascot Pictures. She then starred opposite John Wayne in The Star Packer and The Trail Beyond for Monogram Pictures. She had some minor roles in movies for Universal Studios, such as I've Been Around in 1935, but the studio stopped using her after she spurned romantic advances from production executive Carl Laemmle, Jr. She also appeared in the Broadway production of Night of January 16th in 1935.

Personal life
Hillie married radio emcee Frank Gill Jr., in 1933. They had two children (Kelly and Pamela Lincoln), but they divorced in 1952. She retired from acting in the 1940s to focus on raising her children, returning to work as "Clara Bagley" in two early 1950s episodes of The George Burns and Gracie Allen Show. In 1952 she married NBC executive Richard Linkroun. They divorced after 11 years.  After her divorce from Linkroun, Hillie worked in health care administration for several years. She was later the United States representative for English author Barbara Cartland. She died in 1997 in Fairfield, Connecticut from a stroke.

Selected filmography
 Madame Butterfly (1932) - Bridesmaid (uncredited)
 From Hell to Heaven (1933) - Sonnie Lockwood
 Under the Tonto Rim (1933) - Nina Weston
 Man of the Forest (1933) - Alice Gayner
 Duck Soup (1933) - Trentino's Blonde Secretary (uncredited)
 Search for Beauty (1934) - Susie (uncredited)
 Six of a Kind (1934) - Safe-Deposit Clerk (uncredited)
 House of Mystery (1934) - Ella Browning
 The Star Packer (1934) - Anita Matlock
 Romance in the Rain (1934) - Cinderella Girl
 The Trail Beyond (1934) - Felice Newsome
 Mystery Mountain (1934) - Jane Corwin
 I've Been Around (1935) - Girl
 Princess O'Hara (1935) - Alberta Whitley
 Rescue Squad (1935) - Norma Britt
 Mister Dynamite (1935) - Mona Lewis
 Rebellious Daughters (1938) - Barbara 'Babe' Webster
 The Reluctant Dragon (1941) - Sculptor (uncredited)

References

External links

1914 births
1997 deaths
20th-century American actresses
American film actresses
Actresses from Michigan
People from Hancock, Michigan